Tzu Chi University of Science and Technology (TCUST) is a private university in Hualien City, Hualien County, Taiwan.

History
Tzu Chi University of Science and Technology was established by Tzu Chi Buddhist Compassion Relief Foundation in 1989.

As a specialist in science and technology, the university offers students a number of courses in these fields. It has departments in nursing, radiological technology, health management, information technology, and marketing and distribution management.

The university is located in Hualien City, along the east coast of Taiwan.

Faculties
 Department of Marketing and Distribution Management
 Department of Health Administration
 Department of Information Engineering and Informatics
 Department of Nursing
 Department of Radiological Technology
 Graduate Institution of Long-term Care

See also
 List of universities in Taiwan

References

External links

 Tzu Chi University of Science and Technology

1989 establishments in Taiwan
Educational institutions established in 1989
Universities and colleges in Hualien County
Buddhist universities and colleges in Taiwan
Tzu Chi
Hualien City
Scientific organizations based in Taiwan
Universities and colleges in Taiwan
Technical universities and colleges in Taiwan